Hua Luogeng or Hua Loo-Keng (12 November 1910 – 12 June 1985) was a Chinese mathematician and politician famous for his important contributions to number theory and for his role as the leader of mathematics research and education in the People's Republic of China. He was largely responsible for identifying and nurturing the renowned mathematician Chen Jingrun who proved Chen's theorem, the best known result on the Goldbach conjecture. In addition, Hua's later work on mathematical optimization and operations research made an enormous impact on China's economy. He was elected a foreign associate of the US National Academy of Sciences in 1982.  He was elected a member of the standing Committee of the first to sixth National people's Congress, Vice-Chairman of the sixth National Committee of the Chinese People's Political Consultative Conference (April 1985) and Vice-Chairman of the China Democratic League (1979). He joined the Communist Party of China in 1979.

Hua did not receive a formal university education. Although awarded several honorary PhDs, he never got a formal degree from any university. In fact, his formal education only consisted of six years of primary school and three years of middle school. For that reason, Xiong Qinglai, after reading one of Hua's early papers, was amazed by Hua's mathematical talent, and in 1931 Xiong invited him to study mathematics at Tsinghua University.

Biography

Early years (1910–1936)
Hua Luogeng was born in Jintan, Jiangsu on 12 November, 1910. Hua's father was a small businessman. Hua met a capable math teacher in middle school who recognized his talent early and encouraged him to read advanced texts. After middle school, Hua enrolled in Chinese Vocational College in Shanghai, and there he distinguished himself by winning a national abacus competition. Although tuition fees at the college were low, living costs proved too high for his means, and Hua was forced to leave a term before graduating. After failing to find a job in Shanghai, Hua returned home in 1927 to help in his father's store. In 1929, Hua contracted typhoid fever and was in bed for half a year. The culmination of Hua's illness resulted in the partial paralysis of his left leg, which impeded his movement quite severely for the rest of his life.

After middle school, Hua continued to study mathematics independently with the few books he had, and studied the entire high school and early undergraduate math curriculum. By the time Hua returned to Jintan, he was already engaged in independent mathematics research, and his first publication Some Researches on the Theorem of Sturm, appeared in the December 1929 issue of the Shanghai periodical Science. In the following year Hua showed in a short note in the same journal that a certain 1926 paper claiming to have solved the quintic was fundamentally flawed. Hua's lucid analysis caught the eye of Prof. Xiong Qinglai at Tsinghua University in Beijing, and in 1931 Hua was invited, despite his lack of formal qualification and not without some reservations on the part of several faculty members, to join the mathematics department there. 

At Tsinghua, Hua began as a clerk in the library, and then moved to become an assistant in mathematics. By September 1932, he was an instructor, and two years later, after having published another dozen papers, he was promoted to the rank of lecturer.

During 1935–36 Jacques Hadamard and Norbert Wiener visited Tsinghua, and Hua eagerly attended the lectures of both and created a good impression. Wiener visited England soon afterward and spoke of Hua to G. H. Hardy. In this way Hua received an invitation to come to Cambridge, England, where he stayed for two years.

Early middle years (1936–1950)
While at Cambridge University, Hua worked on applying the Hardy–Littlewood circle method towards problems in number theory. He produced seminal work on Waring's problem, which would establish his reputation within the international math community. In 1938, after the full outbreak of the Second Sino-Japanese War, Hua chose to return to China to Tsinghua, where he was appointed full professor despite not having any degree. At the time, with vast areas of China under Japanese occupation, Tsinghua University, Peking University, and Nankai University had merged into the Southwest Associated University in Kunming, capital of the southern province Yunnan. In spite of the hardships of poverty, enemy bombings, and relative academic isolation from the rest of the world, Hua continued to produce first-rate mathematics. During his eight years there, Hua studied Vinogradov's seminal method of estimating trigonometric sums and reformulated it in sharper form, in what is now known universally as Vinogradov's mean value theorem. This famous result is central to improved versions of the Hilbert–Waring theorem, and has important applications to the study of the Riemann zeta function. Hua wrote up this work in a booklet titled Additive Theory of Prime Numbers that was accepted for publication in Russia as early as 1940, but owing to the war, did not appear in expanded form until 1947 as a monograph of the Steklov Institute. In the closing years of the Kunming period, Hua turned his interests to algebra and analysis towards which he soon began to make original contributions.

After the war, Hua spent three months in the Soviet Union in the spring of 1946, at Ivan Vinogradov's invitation, following which Hua departed for Institute for Advanced Study in Princeton University. At Princeton, Hua worked on matrix theory, functions of several complex variables, and group theory. At this time civil war was raging in China and it was not easy to travel, and for "convenience of travel," the Chinese authorities had assigned Hua the rank of general in his passport.

In the spring of 1948, Hua accepted appointment as full professor at the University of Illinois Urbana–Champaign. However, his stay in Illinois was far too brief. In October 1949, the People's Republic of China was established, and Hua, wanting to be part of a new epoch, decided to return to China with his wife and kids, despite having settled comfortably in the United States.

Later career in China (1950–1985)
Back in China, Hua threw himself into educational reform and the organization of mathematical activity at the graduate level, in the schools, and among workers in the burgeoning industry. In July 1952 the Mathematical Institute of the Chinese Academy of Sciences (CAS) came into being, with Hua as its first director. The following year he was one of a 26-member delegation from CAS to visit the Soviet Union in order to establish links with Russian science. Later, he was the first Chair of the Department of Mathematics and Vice President of University of Science & Technology of China (USTC), a new type of Chinese university established by CAS in 1958, which was aimed at fostering skilled researchers necessary for the economic development, defense and education in science and technology. 

Despite his many teaching and administrative duties, Hua remained active in research and continued to write, not only on topics that had engaged him before but also in areas that were new to him or had been only lightly touched on before. In 1956, his voluminous text, Introduction to Number Theory, appeared, and later it was published in English by Springer. Harmonic Analysis of Functions of Several Complex Variables in the Classical Domains came out in 1958 and was translated into Russian in the same year, followed by an English translation by the American Mathematical Society in 1963.

Outside of pure math, Hua first proposed in 1952 the development of China's electronic computer, and in early 1953, an initial research team for this project was formed under Hua's leadership by the Mathematical Institute of the Chinese Academy of Sciences.

The start of the Great Leap Forward in 1958 came with a vehement attack on pure mathematics and intellectuals, which prompted Hua to shift towards applied mathematics. Hua developed, with Wang Yuan, a broad interest in linear programming, operations research, and multidimensional numerical integration. In connection with the last of these, the study of the Monte Carlo method and the role of uniform distribution led them to invent an alternative deterministic method based on ideas from algebraic number theory. Their theory was set out in Applications of Number Theory to Numerical Analysis, which was published much later, in 1978, and by Springer in English translation in 1981. The newfound interest in applicable mathematics took him in the 1960s, accompanied by a team of assistants, all over China to show workers of all kinds how to apply their reasoning faculty to the solution of shop-floor and everyday problems. Whether in ad hoc problem-solving sessions in factories or open-air teachings, he touched his audiences with the spirit of mathematics to such an extent that he became a national hero and even earned an unsolicited letter of commendation from Mao Zedong, this last a valuable protection in uncertain times. Hua had a commanding presence, a genial personality, and a wonderful way of putting things simply, and the impact of his travels spread his fame and the popularity of mathematics across the land.

Following the Cultural Revolution, Hua resumed contact with Western mathematicians. In 1980 Hua became a cultural ambassador of China charged with re-establishing links with Western academics, and during the next five years he travelled extensively in Europe, the United States, and Japan. In 1979 he was a visiting research fellow of the then Science Research Council of the United Kingdom at the University of Birmingham and during 1983–84 he was Sherman Fairchild Distinguished Scholar at the California Institute of Technology. He died of a heart attack at the end of a lecture he gave in Tokyo on 12 June 1985.

Hua Luogeng Park in Jintan, Jiangsu has been named after him.

Works

References

External links

Biographical memoir – by Heini Halberstam
Biography of Loo-Keng Hua – from MacTutor History of Mathematics from University of St Andrews
 Hua Loo-Keng : a biography by Wang Yuan
 Heini Halberstam, "Loo-Keng Hua", Biographical Memoirs of the National Academy of Sciences (2002)

1910 births
1985 deaths
20th-century Chinese mathematicians
Boxer Indemnity Scholarship recipients
Chinese Communist Party politicians from Jiangsu
Educators from Changzhou
Foreign associates of the National Academy of Sciences
Mathematicians from Jiangsu
Members of the Chinese Academy of Sciences
Academic staff of the National Southwestern Associated University
Number theorists
People from Jintan District
Scientists from Changzhou
Academic staff of Tsinghua University
TWAS fellows
Academic staff of the University of Science and Technology of China
Victims of the Cultural Revolution
Vice Chairpersons of the National Committee of the Chinese People's Political Consultative Conference
Burials at Babaoshan Revolutionary Cemetery